The following is a list of notable events and releases of the year 1968 in Norwegian music.

Events

May
 The 16th Bergen International Festival started in Bergen, Norway.

June
 The 5th Kongsberg Jazz Festival started in Kongsberg, Norway.

July
 The 8th Moldejazz started in Molde, Norway.

Albums released

Unknown date

K
 Egil Kapstad Choir & Orchestra
 Syner (Norsk Jazzforum)

R
 Terje Rypdal
 Bleak House (Polydor Records)

Deaths

 April
 14 – Bjarne Amdahl, composer and orchestra conductor (born 1903).

 September
 17 – Jolly Kramer-Johansen, composer (born 1902).

 October
 29 – Marius Ulfrstad, composer and orchestra conductor (born 1890).

 December
 26 – Inger Bang Lund, pianist and composer (born 1876).

Births

 January
 19 – Jørn Øien, jazz pianist and keyboardist.
 21 – Frank Kvinge, jazz guitarist.

 February
 6 – Sigurd Slåttebrekk, classical pianist.

 March
 1 – Per Oddvar Johansen, jazz drummer and composer.
 2 – Rune Brøndbo, jazz keyboardist, guitarist, and composer.
 22
 Arve Henriksen, trumpeter, vocalist, and composer.
 Øystein Aarseth, black metal guitarist and music producer (died 1993).
 30 – Jon Øivind Ness, contemporary composer.

 April
 6 – Bettina Smith, mezzo soprano.
 7 – Stein Torleif Bjella, songwriter, singer and guitarist.
 8 – Paal Flaata, vocalist, Midnight Choir.

 July
 10 – David Gald, jazz tubist.
 16 – Finn Guttormsen, jazz upright bassist, Farmers Market.

 August
 7 – Geir Luedy Andersen, singer-songwriter and record producer.
 20 – Frode Barth, jazz guitarist and composer.
 21 – Jan Bang, musician and record producer.

 September
 23 – Bjørn Berge, blues singer and guitarist.

 December
 11 – Charlotte Thiis-Evensen, journalist and audio, film, visual artist.

See also
 1968 in Norway
 Music of Norway
 Norway in the Eurovision Song Contest 1968

References

 
Norwegian music
Norwegian
Music
1960s in Norwegian music